Robert Clements Moore (31 January 1872 – 6 June 1938) was an Australian rules footballer who played with Melbourne in the Victorian Football League (VFL).

Notes

External links 

1872 births
Australian rules footballers from Victoria (Australia)
Melbourne Football Club players
1938 deaths